Included in the list are charts of the top box-office earners, a chart of high-grossing animated films by the calendar year, a timeline showing the transition of the highest-grossing animated film record, and a chart of the highest-grossing animated film franchises and series. All charts are ranked by international theatrical box office performance where possible, excluding income derived from home video, broadcasting rights and merchandise. 

Animated family films have performed consistently well at the box office, with Disney enjoying lucrative re-releases prior to the home video era with Walt Disney Animation Studios, who have produced films such as Aladdin and The Lion King, both of which were the highest-grossing films of their respective years. Disney Animation also enjoyed later success with both Frozen and Frozen II in addition to Pixar, of which The Incredibles films, the Toy Story films, the Finding Nemo films, and Inside Out have been the best performers; beyond Disney and Pixar, the Shrek, Ice Age, Madagascar and Despicable Me series have met with the most success. The Peter Pan, The Jungle Book, Bambi, and The Lion King series saw successful returns after lying dormant for decades.

Highest-grossing animated films

The chart below lists the highest-grossing animated films. Figures are given in United States dollars (USD). Many films that were released during the 20th century do not appear on this list as figures have not been adjusted for inflation, and as a result all but one of the films in the top 50 were released after 2000. If inflation were adjusted for, Snow White and the Seven Dwarfs would appear at the top of the chart with an adjusted gross of $. The top 11 films on this list are also among the top 50 highest-grossing films of all time, ranking 8th, 11th, 17th, 19th, 22nd, 34th, 35th, 40th, 42nd, 45th and 50th, respectively. The top 10 have each grossed in excess of $1 billion worldwide. All except two—the original 1994 version of The Lion King and The Simpsons Movie—are computer animated films. Despicable Me is the most represented franchise with all 5 films in the Top 50 Highest-grossing animated films.

Highest-grossing animated films by animation type

Computer animation
The following chart is a list of the highest-grossing computer animated films. All films in the top 50 were released after 2000.

All feature films in the Despicable Me, Kung Fu Panda, Finding Nemo, and Incredibles franchises, as well as the main films in the Madagascar franchise, are on the list while the Toy Story, Shrek, Ice Age, and How to Train Your Dragon franchises feature often.

The top 48 films listed are also among the 50 highest-grossing animated films, the top 11 are among the 50 highest-grossing films, and the top 10 have each grossed in excess of $1 billion worldwide.

Stop motion animation
A total of 35 stop motion films have grossed in excess of $1 million. All feature films in the Wallace and Gromit and Shaun the Sheep franchises are on the list, with Wallace and Gromit being the most represented franchise on the list, with three films.

Traditional animation
The following chart is a list of the highest-grossing traditionally-animated films. The main The Jungle Book series has both films in its series to appear in the chart; the Pokémon and SpongeBob SquarePants franchises also has two films on the chart. The top two films on this list are also among on the 50 highest-grossing animated films.

Highest-grossing animated films by year
The top-grossing animated films in the years 1937, 1940, 1942, 1950, 1953, 1955, 1961, 1967, 1992, 1994, 1995, 2004, 2010, 2013, and 2020 were also the highest-grossing films overall those years.

Computer-animated films have been the highest earners in 1995, 1998–2019 and 2021, while 1975 and 1993 are the only years when a stop motion animated feature grossed the highest. Traditional animated films have topped every other year.

The Ice Age franchises have had the most entries be the highest-grossing animated films of the year with four films, while The Rescuers, Finding Nemo, and The Lion King all had both films in each respective franchise be the highest-grossing animated films of the year they were released. 

Animal Farm, Out of an Old Man's Head, Fritz the Cat, and Demon Slayer – The Movie: Mugen Train were the only four adult animated films on the chart.

The top-grossing animated film of the year has usually been an American film, with a few exceptions. Japanese animated features have topped the list at seven occasions: in 1978, 1979, 1980, 1983, 1984, 1987, and 2020; the list has also been topped by a Spanish film in 1945, French in 1949, Swedish in 1968 and 1974, Norwegian in 1975, Belgian in 1976 and Canadian in 1985.

 ( ... ) Since grosses are not limited to original theatrical runs, a film's first-run gross is included in brackets after the total if known.

Timeline of highest-grossing animated films
At least eleven animated films have held the record of highest-grossing animated film at different times. Eight of these were Disney films and two by Pixar. Shrek 2, made by DreamWorks Animation, is the only film on the list not produced by Disney or Pixar.

Bambi held the record for the longest, with 49 years, while both Beauty and the Beast and Finding Nemo held it for the shortest period of a year. The original Lion King was the last non-CG animated film to hold the record. Shrek 2 and Toy Story 3 are the only sequels to hold the record. Finding Nemo was the first CG animated film.

All of these films are still among the highest-grossing animated films except Snow White, Pinocchio and Bambi, and only Snow White, Pinocchio, Bambi, Aladdin and Shrek 2 are not also among the highest-grossing films. The Lion King is the only franchise to hold the record twice.

Computer-animated
The following is a timeline of highest-grossing computer animated films.

Toy Story is the only franchise to hold the record on multiple occasions doing so with the first three movies, Pixar is the only studio to hold the record on multiple occasions doing so six times, while A Bug's Life and Finding Nemo both hold the record the shortest less than a year. Shrek 2, made by DreamWorks Animation, is the only film on the list not produced by Disney or Pixar.

Stop-motion

At least three stop-motions animated films have held the record of highest-grossing animated film at different times. 
Chicken Run held the record for the longest, with 22 years, while The Nightmare Before Christmas held it for the shortest period of 6 years.

Both Chicken Run and The Nightmare Before Christmas are still among the highest-grossing stop-motion animated films.

Highest-grossing animated franchises and film series
The following chart is a list of the highest-grossing animated film franchises. The top six are among the highest-grossing film franchises of all time and, respectively, are ranked 14th, 17th, 19th, 20th, 23rd and 25th of all time. DreamWorks Animation is the most represented studio with 6 franchises on this list. Despicable Me is the highest-grossing animated franchise of all time with $4.6 billion; it is also one of three animated franchises with two films grossing over $1 billion worldwide, the others being Toy Story and Frozen. Frozen is the only animated franchise where every installment grossed $1 billion; it has the highest per-film average, with nearly $1.4 billion unadjusted. A given franchise needs to have at least two theatrically released films to qualify for this list.

See also
 List of highest-grossing adult-oriented animated films
 List of highest-grossing openings for animated films
 List of highest-grossing anime films
 List of most expensive animated films
 List of highest-grossing live-action/animated films
 List of animated films by box office admissions

Per decade 
List of highest-grossing animated films of the 1980s
List of highest-grossing animated films of the 1990s
List of highest-grossing animated films of the 2000s
List of highest-grossing animated films of the 2010s

Notes

References

Box-office sources

Franchise and series sources

 
 Angry Birds
 
 The Boss Baby

 The Care Bears Movie
 
 
 
 
 
 
 
 
 
 
 
 
 
 
 Cars
 
 The Croods

 Detective Conan / Case Closed
2000 film: 
2001 film: 
2002 film: 
2003 film: 
2004 film: 
2005 film: 
2006 film: 
2007 film: 
2008 film: 
2009 film: 
2010 film: 
2011 film: 
2012 film: 
2013 film: 
2014 film: 
2015 film: 
2016 film: 
2017 film: 
2018 film: 
2019 film: 
2021 film: 
 Lupin III vs. Detective Conan: 
 Cloudy with a Chance of Meatballs
 
 Despicable Me
 
 Doraemon
Franchise total:
 
Original series:
1989 film: 
2000 film: 
2001 film: 
2002 film: 
2003 film: 
2004 film: 
New Generation:
 2006 film: 
 2007 film: 
 2008 film: 
 2009 film: 
 2010 film: 
 2011 film: 
 2012 film: 
 2013 film: 
 2014 film: 
 2015 film: 
 2016 film: 
 2017 film: 
 2018 film: 
 2019 film: 
 2020 film: 
Stand by Me Doraemon:

Dragon Ball

 Finding Nemo
 
 Happy Feet
 
 
 Hotel Transylvania
 
 How to Train Your Dragon
 
 Ice Age
 
 The Incredibles
 
 The Jungle Book
 
 
 Kung Fu Panda
 
 Lego
 
 The Lion King
 
 
 Madagascar
 
 Monsters, Inc.
 
 Planes
 
 Pokémon
 1998 film: 
 1999 film: 
 2000 film: 
 2001 film: 
 2002 film: 
 2003 film: 
 2004 film: 
 2005 film: 
 2006 film: 
 2007 film: 
 2008 film: 
 2009 film: 
 2010 film: 
 2011 film: 
 2012 film: 
 2013 film: 
 2014 film: 
 2015 film: 
 2016 film: 
 2017 film: 
 2018 film: 
 2019 film: 
 2020 film: 
 Rio
 
 The Secret Life of Pets
 
 Shrek
 
 Toy Story
 
 
 
 Wreck-It Ralph
 

Animated
Highest-grossing